Bob Snodgrass is an American lampworker known for his contributions to the art of glass pipe-making and glass art. He began lampworking in 1971 while learning from and working with Chuck Murphy for a few years.  

Bob purchased his first torch in 1974 while living in Independence,  Missouri where he began to hone his craft over the next several years.  He moved back to Ohio and a few other states selling his work at local arts & crafts festivals, flea markets and street fairs.  In 1986 Bob, his wife and their youngest child moved into a bus and hit the road.  They worked their way around the country doing all types of festivals and shows.  On Easter weekend in 1987 Bob attended his first Grateful Dead show at Irvine.  "I saw the crowd burst into dancing and thought this was so tribal I want to be part of this."  From there Bob started following the Dead on tour and his craft quickly became sought after.  Eventually they settled in Eugene, Oregon.  

Snodgrass is credited with having invented (by accident, he says) color changing glass, a type of borosilicate glass mixed (fumed) with gold and/or silver, which changes colors as the dark resin builds up on the inside of the glass. He founded the Eugene Glass School.

The documentary film Degenerate Art depicts the glass subculture that Snodgrass helped to create. He has been called the "Godfather of glass."

Apprentices 

Snodgrass taught in Oregon many younger artists how to create functional glass art, including Jason Harris of Jerome Baker Designs (company), who gained notoriety throughout the 1990s on the west coast for his high quality glass bongs and pipes. Jerome Baker Designs had its assets seized during Operation Pipe Dreams, a federal operation to prosecute glass blowers in the United States.  After legalization, Jerome Baker Designs began picking up steam again, ultimately creating the world's largest bong at 24-feet high and 800 pounds.

Snodgrass's apprentices also went on to teach many other famous glassblowers. One of which being Andrew Young (Drue Downs). He now continues to blow glass twenty seven years later. He shows his success via his shorty bull ATM, Boxer Mercury The Magnificent, and alchemy rug.

See also 

 Official website

References

Living people
Artists from Eugene, Oregon
Glassblowers
Year of birth missing (living people)